Samir Gustav Badran (born May 25, 1990) is a Swedish television personality and singer. Since 2022 he has been working as a real estate agent.

Career 
In 2013, Badran participated in the reality series Paradise Hotel broadcast on TV3. He also took part in Paradise Hotel again in the 2014 season for one week. Along with the fashion blogger Viktor Frisk, Badran started the music duo Samir & Viktor. In May 2014, the duo released their first single, "Success". The song peaked at number one on the Swedish iTunes chart during its first week. Samir & Viktor participated in Melodifestivalen 2015 with the song "Groupie", in a bid to represent Sweden in the Eurovision Song Contest 2015 in Vienna, Austria. They went for it a second time in 2016 with the song "Bada nakna", reaching twelfth place in the competition but hitting the number one spot on the Swedish DigiListan sales chart in February 2016. Badran then competed in the celebrity dance show Let's Dance 2017, which was broadcast on TV4 and he finished in fifth place. He also participated in Farmen VIP 2018, which was broadcast on TV4. He was furthermore the co-presenter of Talang 2019 and 2020.

Personal life
Badran's father is a Palestinian and was born in the Gaza Strip; he has relatives in the area and visits them when it is possible. In August 2014, a nine-year-old cousin of Badran was killed after the Israeli bombing of the UN school in Jabalia, Gaza.
He dated with Mikaela Samuelsson 2015.

In 2020, he confirmed that he was studying to become a real estate agent. As of 2022, he works as a real estate agent at Mäklarhuset in Stockholm.

Discography

Singles
Solo

as Samir & Viktor
2014: "Success"
2015: "Groupie
2015: "Saxofuckingfon"
2016: "Bada nakna"
2016: "Fick Feeling"
2017: "Kung"
2017: "Vi gör det ändå"
2017: "Rakt in i kaklet"
2018: "Shuffla"

Notes

References

External links 

Living people
1990 births
Swedish television personalities
Swedish people of Palestinian descent
21st-century Swedish singers
21st-century Swedish male singers
Melodifestivalen contestants of 2018
Melodifestivalen contestants of 2016
Melodifestivalen contestants of 2015